Empty Clip Studios, LLC is a video game developer based in San Diego, California and was founded in July 2007. It was formed by Francois Bertrand and Matt Shores.

On September 8, 2008, the company released their debut game Groovin' Blocks, a music-based puzzle game for WiiWare. On December 17, 2008, it was followed-up by Glow, an iPhone puzzle game.

Games developed 
 Groovin' Blocks - WiiWare (2008)
 Glow - iPhone (2008)
 Auditorium - PS3/PSP (2010/2011)
 Symphony - Windows (2012)
 F-117A Stealth Fighter - Windows (2014)
 Dead Island: Retro Revenge - Windows, PS4 (2016)
 A King's Tale: Final Fantasy XV - PS4, Xbox One (2016)
 Attack of the Bugs - Windows (2017)
 F-117A Stealth Fighter - Windows, Switch (2020)
 Hoshi Wo Miru Hito - Switch (2020)
 NHL 94 Rewind - PS4, Xbox One (2020)
 Streets of Kamurocho - Windows (2020)

References

External links 
 Empty Clip Studios' website
 Play.tn, "Empty Clip Studios Announces Groovin' Blocks for WiiWare"
 N4G.com,"The Challenges of Solo Game Design with Empty Clip Studios' Francois Bertrand"
 Empty Clip Studios at GameSpot
 Empty Clip Studios at IGN

Companies based in San Diego
Privately held companies based in California
Video game companies of the United States
Video game development companies